NRAS can be 
Neuroblastoma RAS viral oncogene homolog
Australian National Rental Affordability Scheme